The phrase "standing on the shoulders of giants" is a metaphor which means "using the understanding gained by major thinkers who have gone before in order to make intellectual progress".

It is a metaphor of dwarfs standing on the shoulders of giants and expresses the meaning of "discovering truth by building on previous discoveries". This concept has been dated to the 12th century and, according to John of Salisbury, is attributed to Bernard of Chartres. But its most familiar and popular expression occurs in a 1675 letter by Isaac Newton: "if I have seen further [than others], it is by standing on the shoulders of giants."

Early references

Middle Ages 
An unknown attribution to Bernard of Chartres from John of Salisbury in 1159, John wrote in his Metalogicon: "Bernard of Chartres used to compare us to dwarfs perched on the shoulders of giants. He pointed out that we see more and farther than our predecessors, not because we have keener vision or greater height, but because we are lifted up and borne aloft on their gigantic stature." However, according to Umberto Eco, the most ancient attestation of the phrase dates back to Priscian cited by Guillaume de Conches.

According to medieval historian Richard William Southern, Bernard was comparing contemporary 12th century scholars to the ancient scholars of Greece and Rome: A similar conceit also appears in a contemporary work on church history by Ordericus Vitalis.

[The phrase] sums up the quality of the cathedral schools in the history of learning, and indeed characterizes the age which opened with Gerbert (950–1003) and Fulbert (960–1028) and closed in the first quarter of the 12th century with Peter Abelard. [The phrase] is not a great claim; neither, however, is it an example of abasement before the shrine of antiquity. It is a very shrewd and just remark, and the important and original point was the dwarf could see a little further than the giant. That this was possible was above all due to the cathedral schools with their lack of a well-rooted tradition and their freedom from a clearly defined routine of study.

Religious texts 

 The visual image (from Bernard of Chartres) appears in the stained glass of the south transept of Chartres Cathedral. The tall windows under the rose window show the four major prophets of the Hebrew Bible (Isaiah, Jeremiah, Ezekiel, and Daniel) as gigantic figures, and the four New Testament evangelists (Matthew, Mark, Luke, and John) as ordinary-size people sitting on their shoulders. The evangelists, though smaller, "see more" than the huge prophets (since they saw the Messiah about whom the prophets spoke).

The phrase also appears in the works of the Jewish tosaphist Isaiah di Trani (c. 1180 – c. 1250):

Should Joshua the son of Nun endorse a mistaken position, I would reject it out of hand, I do not hesitate to express my opinion, regarding such matters in accordance with the modicum of intelligence allotted to me. I was never arrogant claiming "My Wisdom served me well". Instead I applied to myself the parable of the philosophers. For I heard the following from the philosophers, The wisest of the philosophers was asked: "We admit that our predecessors were wiser than we. At the same time we criticize their comments, often rejecting them and claiming that the truth rests with us. How is this possible?" The wise philosopher responded: "Who sees further a dwarf or a giant? Surely a giant for his eyes are situated at a higher level than those of the dwarf. But if the dwarf is placed on the shoulders of the giant who sees further? ... So too we are dwarfs astride the shoulders of giants. We master their wisdom and move beyond it. Due to their wisdom we grow wise and are able to say all that we say, but not because we are greater than they.

Early modern and modern references

Isaac Newton 

Isaac Newton remarked in a letter to his rival Robert Hooke dated 5 February 1675:
What Des-Cartes  did was a good step. You have added much several ways, & especially in taking the colours of thin plates into philosophical consideration. If I have seen further it is by standing on the sholders  of Giants.
This has recently been interpreted by a few writers as a sarcastic remark directed at Hooke's appearance. Although Hooke was not of particularly short stature, he was of slight build and had been afflicted from his youth with a severe kyphosis. However, at this time Hooke and Newton were on good terms and had exchanged many letters in tones of mutual regard. Only later, when Robert Hooke criticized some of Newton's ideas regarding optics, was Newton so offended that he withdrew from public debate. The two men remained enemies until Hooke's death.

Others 

Diego de Estella took up the quotation in the 16th century; by the 17th century it had become commonplace. Robert Burton, in the second edition of The Anatomy of Melancholy (1624), quotes Stella thus:
I say with Didacus Stella, a dwarf standing on the shoulders of a giant may see farther than a giant himself.
Later editors of Burton misattributed the quotation to Lucan; in their hands Burton's attribution Didacus Stella, in luc 10, tom. ii "Didacus on the Gospel of Luke, chapter 10; volume 2" became a reference to Lucan's Pharsalia 2.10. No reference or allusion to the quotation is found there.

In 1634, Marin Mersenne quoted the expression in his Questions harmoniques: ... comme l'on dit, il est bien facile, & mesme necessaire de voir plus loin que nos devanciers, lors que nous sommes montez sur leur espaules ...Blaise Pascal, in the "Preface to the Treatise on the Vacuum" expresses the same idea, without talking about shoulders, but rather about the knowledge handed down to us by the ancients as steps that allow us to climb higher and see farther than they could:C'est de cette façon que l'on peut aujourd'hui prendre d'autres sentiments et de nouvelles opinions sans mépris et sans ingratitude, puisque les premières connaissances qu'ils nous ont données ont servi de degrés aux nôtres, et que dans ces avantages nous leur sommes redevables de l'ascendant que nous avons sur eux; parce que s'étant élevés jusqu'à un certain degré où ils nous ont portés, le moindre effort nous fait monter plus haut, et avec moins de peine et moins de gloire nous nous trouvons au-dessus d'eux. C'est de là que nous pouvons découvrir des choses qu'il leur était impossible d'apercevoir. Notre vue a plus d'étendue; et, quoiqu'ils connussent aussi bien que nous tout ce qu'ils pouvaient remarquer de la nature, ils n'en connaissaient pas tant néanmoins, et nous voyons plus qu'eux.Later in the 17th century, George Herbert, in his Jacula Prudentum (1651), wrote "A dwarf on a giant's shoulders sees farther of the two."

Samuel Taylor Coleridge, in The Friend (1828), wrote:
The dwarf sees farther than the giant, when he has the giant's shoulder to mount on.
Against this notion, Friedrich Nietzsche argues that a dwarf (the academic scholar) brings even the most sublime heights down to his level of understanding. In the section of Thus Spoke Zarathustra (1882) entitled "On the Vision and the Riddle", Zarathustra climbs to great heights with a dwarf on his shoulders to show him his greatest thought. Once there however, the dwarf fails to understand the profundity of the vision and Zarathustra reproaches him for "making things too easy on [him]self." If there is to be anything resembling "progress" in the history of philosophy, Nietzsche in "Philosophy in the Tragic Age of the Greeks" (1873) writes, it can only come from those rare giants among men, "each giant calling to his brother through the desolate intervals of time", an idea he got from Schopenhauer's work in Der handschriftliche Nachlass.

Contemporary references
 NASA’s official film of the Apollo 17 lunar landing mission was titled On the Shoulders of Giants
 The British two pound coin bears the inscription STANDING ON THE SHOULDERS OF GIANTS on its edge; this is intended as a quotation of Newton.
 Stephen Hawking stated: "Each generation stands on the shoulders of those who have gone before them, just as I did as a young PhD student in Cambridge, inspired by the work of Isaac Newton, James Clerk Maxwell and Albert Einstein."
 The Lubavitcher Rebbe said that our generation is compared to "dwarves standing on giants' shoulders". Although we may appear to be on a lower spiritual level (dwarves) than previous generations (who were like giants on a spiritual level), when our (much smaller) achievements are added to their (much larger) achievements, the combined achievements ultimately bring us to the era of Moshiach!
 Google Scholar, a search engine for academic literature, displays the phrase "Stand on the shoulders of giants" below the search field.

See also
Derivative work
Great Conversation

References

External links

Overview of history of the expression

Latin proverbs
Metaphors referring to body parts
Sociology of scientific knowledge
Tradition
Isaac Newton
12th-century neologisms
Quotations from science